Mercantile Investment Trust is a large British investment trust dedicated to investments in medium and smaller companies in the United Kingdom. Established in 1884, the company is a constituent of the FTSE 250 Index. The chairman is Angus Gordon Lennox.

References

External links 
 Official site

Financial services companies established in 1884
Investment trusts of the United Kingdom
JPMorgan Chase